The Roosevelt County Courthouse  built in 1938 is an historic Art Deco courthouse located at 100 West 2nd Street in Portales, New Mexico. It was designed by architect Robert E. Merrell of Clovis (designer of the Curry County Courthouse and the Hotel Clovis in Clovis, New Mexico) and built of poured Portland cement.

On December 3, 2008, it was added to the National Register of Historic Places.

See also

National Register of Historic Places listings in Roosevelt County, New Mexico

References

County courthouses in New Mexico
Courthouses on the National Register of Historic Places in New Mexico
Buildings and structures in Roosevelt County, New Mexico
Government buildings completed in 1938
Art Deco courthouses
Art Deco architecture in New Mexico
National Register of Historic Places in Roosevelt County, New Mexico
1938 establishments in New Mexico